It is the postgraduate leadership program at Yenching Academy of Peking University in Beijing, China. Announced in 2014 and established in 2015, it is the first such program to launch in China. The highly selective program offers Yenching Scholarships, including tuition, accommodation, transportation, and a living stipend, to all students in the Academy. Yenching Scholars are selected annually from around the world through a competitive admission process. Unlike most graduate master's degrees in China that run two years for professional degrees and three years for academic degrees, the program lasts one year. There is also the option for Scholars to extend their studies for a second year, as well as the opportunity for Scholars to continue with doctoral studies at Peking.

"Drawing inspiration from classical Chinese academy (Shuyuan) as well as the Rhodes Scholars' Program," the Yenching Program at Peking University will compete with the Schwarzman Scholars Program (SSP) at Tsinghua University in China and similar global scholarship programs around the world. It is the first such program to launch in Asia.

Studies
The Yenching Program is an intensive global leadership program designed to provide outstanding young scholars with a broad interdisciplinary graduate education that reflects global perspectives. The Program will initially consist of concentrations in law and society, economics and management, public policy and international relations, literature and culture, history and archaeology, and philosophy and religion. The interdisciplinary nature of the Program is quite innovative in China, given the significant level of specialization into traditional fields in China. Courses at Yenching will be taught in English, however, those interested can take other courses at Peking in Chinese with more English courses expected as the university moves towards full bilingual (English and Chinese) education. It is possible that as the Program grows all courses offered by the university's graduate master's programs will be open to Yenching Scholars, as many of the Yenching courses are already offered in English through Peking's International Programs such as the MBA, MPA, MIR, and LLM in Chinese Law.

Correspondingly, the elite liberal undergraduate Yuanpei Program at Yuanpei College offers similar opportunities for undergraduate students at Peking University.

Residence
During their studies, Yenching Scholars will live in Yenching Academy, a residential college of Peking University, built specifically for the Program and modeled on those at Harvard and MIT in the United States and Oxford and Cambridge in the United Kingdom. Located in Haidan district of Beijing city, the political, cultural, and academic capital of China, Scholars will experience one year of study and immersion including class work, field studies, internships, and travel.

See also
 Yuanpei College at Peking University - similar type of program at the undergraduate level

References

External links
 Yenching Academy

Peking University